Scipione Cappella (active 1743) was an Italian historical painter. He was initially trained with his uncle, Domenico Viola, but then became a pupil of Francesco Solimena. He was known mainly for his ability to make copies of the latter master's paintings.

References

18th-century Italian painters
Italian male painters
Italian Baroque painters
Year of death unknown
Year of birth unknown
18th-century Italian male artists